Howard Emerson Flight, Baron Flight (born 16 June 1948) is a Conservative politician in the United Kingdom and a member of the House of Lords who was Member of Parliament for Arundel and South Downs from 1997 to 2005. He held several Shadow posts: Shadow Economic Secretary to the Treasury from 1999 to 2001, Shadow Paymaster General from 2001 to 2002, and Shadow Chief Secretary to the Treasury from 2002 to 2004.

Early and personal life 
Flight was educated at Brentwood School, Magdalene College, Cambridge and the University of Michigan's Ross School of Business. From 1970 to 1998 he worked as an investment adviser and director in various banks. He stood unsuccessfully for Parliament for Bermondsey in the February and October 1974 general elections. Flight is author of All you Need to know about Exchange Rates (1989), and contributor to the book The City in Europe and the World (2005). He has been married to Christabel since 1974; they have three children: Kitty, Thomas and Maryanne. His wife, entitled to be known as Lady Flight, was previously a councillor representing Warwick ward on Westminster City Council, and served as Lord mayor of Westminster.

Political career 
Flight resigned as Deputy Chairman of the Conservative Party on 24 March 2005, following comments made at a Conservative Way Forward meeting that was being secretly recorded. In the meeting he stated that the Conservatives in office could make more spending cuts than they were promising in their campaign (including in their manifesto) before the general election. Conservative leader Michael Howard that month withdrew the party whip, and announced that Flight was no longer an approved candidate and could not contest the Arundel and South Downs seat as a Conservative party candidate at the 2005 general election. Flight refused to accept this, maintaining that only his constituency Conservative Association had the power to deselect its candidate. On 29 March 2005 he announced that he had an opinion from a Queen's Counsel (an eminent barrister) confirming this view. The Arundel and South Downs Conservative Association initially refused to seek a new candidate, but it reversed its position when Conservative Central Office threatened it with the "Slough treatment", referring to the suspension of that association for refusing to deselect Adrian Hilton.  Amid speculation, Flight confirmed that he would not stand as an independent and would not oppose any decision by the Association to deselect him.

Elections 
On 6 April, Flight was deselected as a Conservative candidate by then- party leader Michael Howard, and removed from his role as party deputy chairman, and his party began the process of selecting a new last-minute candidate. Anne Marie Morris, Laura Sandys, and Nick Herbert put themselves forward for nomination as replacement candidates. The chosen candidate, Nick Herbert, won the seat at the election.

Some years later, after a change of party leader, Flight was placed on the A-List of Conservative Party candidates available to fight the 2010 general election, but in the event he was one of minority on that list not selected as a candidate in open primaries and/or with party recommendation. On 19 November 2010, it was announced that Flight was to be created a life peer and would sit as a Conservative in the House of Lords. His full title, created 13 January 2011, is Baron Flight, of Worcester in the County of Worcestershire.

On 25 November 2010, a week after the announcement of his intended peerage, Flight apologised after suggesting that the government's changes to child benefits would "discourage the middle classes from breeding, but for those on benefits there is every incentive".

Peerage received and other roles
Flight was raised to the peerage in January 2011.  He is a director of companies, including Investec, a venture capital company, his own private equity company, and is chairman of the Entrepreneurs Investment Scheme (EIS) Association of lawyers and accountants, a trustee and Vice President of the Elgar Foundation, a Member of the Advisory Boards of the Centre for Policy Studies, Institute of Economic Affairs and Financial Services Forum.

Arms

Notes and references
Notes 
  
References

External links
Speeches in Parliament & other performance data

1948 births
Living people
Alumni of Magdalene College, Cambridge
Conservative Party (UK) life peers
Conservative Party (UK) MPs for English constituencies
Place of birth missing (living people)
UK MPs 1997–2001
UK MPs 2001–2005
Ross School of Business alumni
British Eurosceptics
Life peers created by Elizabeth II